Formica archboldi is a species of ant in the family Formicidae. They are known for their abnormal behavior, which includes the collection and storage of Odontomachus (trap-jaw) ant skulls.

Formica archboldi ants store these severed ant heads in their nests. The Formica archboldi have odors that are chemically similar to the odors of the trap-jaw ants, which might allow the Formica ants to disguise themselves among the trap-jaw ants. The Formica ants immobilize the trap-jaw ants by spraying formic acid, draging them into the nest, and dismembering them.

Further reading

References

External links

 

archiboldi
Articles created by Qbugbot
Insects described in 1944